The Robert Taylor Ranch is a ranch located on Mandeville Canyon Road, in the Brentwood section of Los Angeles, California. The ranch was built in 1956 for Waite Phillips and designed by architect Robert Byrd. It is about  large, with more than 20,000 square feet of living space.

American actor Robert Taylor owned the ranch for several years before his death in 1969. The ranch was then purchased by Steven J. Earle, then sold in 1974 to Ken Roberts, former owner of the KROQ-FM radio station. The ranch is also the setting for most of the 1983 Sam Peckinpah movie, The Osterman Weekend.

In 2010, the ranch was sold to hedge fund New Stream Capital to settle a $27,500,000 legal claim. On November 30, 2012, the ranch was resold at an auction for $12 million to Fred Latsko, a Chicago-based real estate developer. The auction was conducted by Concierge Auctions in partnership with Hilton & Hyland, an affiliate of Christie's International Real Estate. The auction firm and Hilton & Hyland identified 761 buyer prospects and 12 bidders in only four weeks.

References

External links

Robert Taylor Ranch in Brentwood, California sold through auction, includes 15 photos and description.

Houses in Los Angeles
Brentwood, Los Angeles